268 Adorea is a very large main belt asteroid, about  in width. It was discovered by A. Borrelly on 8 June 1887 in Marseilles. This asteroid is a member of the Themis family and is classified as a primitive carbonaceous F-type/C-type asteroid. The orbital plane is tilted at an angle of 2.44° to the plane of the ecliptic.

From February 23 until March 2, 2006, photometric measurements were taken of the asteroid. This result is consistent with some, but not all previous results. However, the new data is inconsistent with the longer period.

In May 1979, 268 Adorea was positioned in proximity of the galaxy NGC 4517 and as a bright new light source it was identified as a potential supernova. However, the light was missing from a second photographic plate taken ten days later, and the source was soon identified as the asteroid.

The name refers to adorea liba, the Latin name for spelt cakes produced from meal and salt offered by the Romans as a sacrifice; the name was controversial among astronomers, as all previous asteroids had been named for humans or mythological figures.

References

External links 
 The Asteroid Orbital Elements Database
 Minor Planet Discovery Circumstances
 Asteroid Lightcurve Data File
 
 

000268
Discoveries by Alphonse Borrelly
Named minor planets
000268
18870608